Luciano Damián Balbi (born 4 April 1989) is an Argentine footballer who plays as a left-back for Brown de Adrogué.

Honours
Lanús
Copa Sudamericana: 2013

External links

1989 births
Living people
Footballers from Rosario, Santa Fe
Argentine footballers
Argentine expatriate footballers
Association football defenders
Argentine Primera División players
Segunda División players
Ecuadorian Serie A players
Veikkausliiga players
Club Atlético Lanús footballers
Club Atlético Huracán footballers
L.D.U. Quito footballers
Real Valladolid players
Extremadura UD footballers
FC Inter Turku players
Panetolikos F.C. players
Club Atlético Temperley footballers
Ferro Carril Oeste footballers
Club Atlético Brown footballers
Argentine expatriate sportspeople in Ecuador
Argentine expatriate sportspeople in Spain
Argentine expatriate sportspeople in Finland
Argentine expatriate sportspeople in Greece
Expatriate footballers in Ecuador
Expatriate footballers in Spain
Expatriate footballers in Finland
Expatriate footballers in Greece